Moon Zero Two is a 1969 British science fiction film from Hammer Films, directed by Roy Ward Baker, and starring James Olson, Catherine Schell, Warren Mitchell, and Adrienne Corri.

The film takes place on the Moon in the year 2021. A former-astronaut-turned-salvager, Bill Kemp, helps a millionaire space industrialist capture a 6000-tonne sapphire asteroid, while also helping a woman find her brother, a missing miner/prospector.

Moon Zero Two was filmed at the ABPC Elstree Studios in Hertfordshire, England. The screenplay was by Michael Carreras from an original story by Gavin Lyall, Frank Hardman, and Martin Davison. In the U.S., the film was billed as a space Western with the phrase 'The first moon "western"...' The film was a commercial failure at the box office and received negative reviews from film critics.

Plot
In May 2021, the Moon is in the process of being colonized, and this new frontier is attracting a diverse human population to lunar settlements like Moon City, Farside 5, and others.

Two denizens of this rough-and-tumble lunar society are the notorious millionaire J.J. Hubbard and former-astronaut-turned-satellite-salvager Bill Kemp, the first man to set foot on Mars. He left Space Corporation because he wants to explore space, while his former employer only wants to operate commercial passenger flights to and from Mars and Venus.

When Hubbard hears about a small 6000-tonne asteroid made of pure "ceramic" sapphire that is in a low lunar orbit, he hires Kemp to capture it with Kemp's old Moon 02 space ferry. Kemp is to transport it down to the surface of the lunar farside, even though doing so would be against Space Corporation law. Kemp, however, has little choice because he learns from Hubbard that his flight license will soon be revoked due to protests from Space Corporation. Hubbard also reveals that he plans to use the giant sapphire for building much improved rocket engine thermal insulators, profiting from the need for even more powerful rockets to colonize Mercury and the moons of Jupiter.

A young woman named Clementine arrives looking for her brother, a miner/prospector, working a distant patch of moonscape at Spectacle Crater on the lunar farside. Unfortunately, the trip from Moon City on the nearside takes six days by a wheeled lunar vehicle. Since Kemp can go there much more quickly using his Moon 02, she convinces him to help her learn if her brother is still alive. The terrain around his camp is not suitable, so Kemp and Clementine land and travel the remaining distance with a transport buggy. The two discover that Clementine's brother is dead, and that he was murdered for his discovery of a large vein of nickel, that would make him a rich man. They are shot at by some of Hubbard's men, who have followed them to the camp; Kemp takes them out one-by-one.

Hubbard is unhappy that Kemp left to assist Clementine, because Hubbard is the one responsible for her brother's death. He needs the claim to be abandoned so he can take control of it and use it as an isolated landing site for the sapphire asteroid. Hubbard blackmails Kemp into completing the asteroid job by threatening his and Clementine's lives. Kemp is later forced to kill the industrialist and some of his men in a shoot out. He also strands Hubbard's remaining men on the large sapphire, just before the attached retro-rocket fires, sending it toward the lunar surface. With Clementine being her brother's next of kin, she now has legal ownership of the nickel vein and the nearby "crashed" sapphire asteroid, making her a very wealthy woman.

Cast

Production
Moon Zero Two was written by Michael Carreras, based on a story by Martin Davison, Frank Hardman and Gavin Lyall. It was directed by Roy Ward Baker. The score was done by Philip Martell and American jazz musician Don Ellis, his first film score. The title song was performed by Julie Driscoll. Spencer Reeve was the film editor and Carl Toms was costume designer. Special visual effects for the film were created by a team headed by visual effects artist Les Bowie, who worked on numerous Hammer productions and other British-made science fiction features.

Production began on 8 March 1969, focusing on the special effects. Live-action filming began on 31 March at the Associated British Studios. Dance group the Go-Jos appeared in the film. Ori Levy described wearing the moonsuits as "sheer hell", receiving blisters from chafing and back problems from the air conditioner installed to keep him cool. Catherine Schell lost 13 pounds from wearing the suit, causing her to be put on a diet of malted milk and chocolate to maintain her weight. Principal photography wrapped on 10 June. The effects unit at Bray Studios was used on the production.

Among the futuristic set decorations are several examples of the famous "Ball Chair" created in 1966 by Finnish designer Eero Aarnio. A dialogue reference to Neil Armstrong becoming the first man on the Moon was inserted, and a lunar monument erected on the landing site was added to the production. The film was released three months after the Apollo 11 Moon landing.

Reception
Variety wrote that the film "never makes up its mind whether it is a spoof or a straightforward adventure yarn and the uneasy combo comes adrift even in the normally capable hands of producer Michael Carreras (who also wrote the script) and director Roy Ward Baker. It may provide some mild amusement for easygoing audiences but overall it's a fairly dull experience, despite some capable artwork, special effects and lensing by Paul Bessen". The Monthly Film Bulletin stated, "It's all just about bad enough to fill older audiences with nostalgia for the inspired innocence of Flash Gordon, or even the good old days of Abbott and Costello in outer space". Derek Malcolm for The Guardian called the film "dreadfully made from start to finish".

In a 1992 interview with Starlog, Roy Ward Baker was negative towards the film, lamenting its budget for hindering plot possibilities and what he saw as the miscasting of James Olson in the lead role. Baker was also critical of producer and writer Michael Carreras' roles with the film. While being fine with his producing, Baker thought Carreras overstretched himself with his positions.

Home media
Moon Zero Two became a Warner Bros. shared DVD disc release in 2008, along with Hammer Films' 1970 prehistoric adventure When Dinosaurs Ruled the Earth. In 2011, Moon Zero Two was re-released as a stand-alone DVD, adding the film's original theatrical trailer.

Legacy
In 1969, Pan Books released a novelisation of Moon Zero Two, written by John Burke. It was also adapted into a graphic story by Paul Neary and was published in The House of Hammer in April 1977.

Mystery Science Theater 3000
The film was shown and parodied on Mystery Science Theater 3000 episode 111, originally airing on 20 January 1990. The episode was rebroadcast on social media as the MST3K LIVE Social Distancing Riff-Along Special on 3 May 2020, with new riffs by the MST3K Great Cheesy Circus Tour cast.

In 2013, Shout! Factory released the MST3K episode as part of their 25th anniversary boxset, along with episodes focused on The Day the Earth Froze, The Leech Woman, and Gorgo.

References

Citations

Bibliography

External links
 
 
 
 

1960s science fiction adventure films
1968 films
British science fiction adventure films
British Western (genre) science fiction films
Dystopian films
Films shot at Associated British Studios
1960s English-language films
Films directed by Roy Ward Baker
Films set in 2021
Hammer Film Productions films
Moon in film
British space adventure films
Space Western films
Warner Bros. films
Films scored by Don Ellis
1960s British films